Satish K. Agnihotri (born 1 July 1956) is the former Chief Justice of Sikkim High Court. Earlier he has served as a judge of the Madras High Court at Chennai, Tamil Nadu and previously as the judge of Chhattisgarh High Court at Bilaspur Chhattisgarh. He was sworn in by Acting Chief Justice R.K. Agarwal on 26 September 2013 as a judge of the Madras High Court. On 13 February 2014, he assumed the charge as the acting Chief Justice of the Madras High Court. On 22 September 2016, Agnihotri took charge as the Chief Justice of the Sikkim High Court after Justice Sunil Kumar Sinha.

References

1956 births
Living people
Chief Justices of the Madras High Court
20th-century Indian judges
Additional Solicitors General of India
Judges of the Chhattisgarh High Court
20th-century Indian lawyers
Chief Justices of the Sikkim High Court